Hveragerði ("hot-spring yard") is a town and municipality in the south of Iceland, 45 km east of Reykjavík on Iceland's main ringroad, Route 1. The river Varmá runs through the town.

Overview
The surrounding area is part of the Hengill central volcano, and is geothermally active and experiences very frequent (usually minor) earthquakes. The town is known for its greenhouses, which are heated by hot water from volcanic hot springs. The first greenhouse was built in 1923. These springs are the site of occurrence of certain extremophile micro-organisms, that are capable of surviving in extremely hot environments. Close to the church is a hot spring called  ("sand hill hot-spring"), formed during the violent South Iceland earthquake of 1896. A fenced-off geothermal area in the town has numerous hot springs and fumaroles.

Hveragerði contains a number of greenhouses and is a hotbed for Icelandic horticulture.

To the south of Hveragerði, there is the small port of Þorlákshöfn, winter point of departure for the ferry to the Westman Islands.

History
Water from hot springs has been used for heating in this area since 1929. Hveragerði had 121 inhabitants in 1940 and 399 in 1946. Hveragerði  was awarded municipal status (kaupstaðuréttindi) on 1 July 1987. In 1989 the town had 1.593 inhabitants. On 29 May 2008 30 people were injured and many buildings in Hveragerði and its surroundings were damaged by an earthquake (6.3 on the Richter magnitude scale).

Buildings and Culture
Hveragerðiskirkja, a modern Protestant church, was built 1967–72. Listasafn Árnesinga is a museum of arts founded in 1963 where about 500 pieces of art are exhibited. The exhibition Skjálftinn 2008 in Sunnumörk shopping centre refers to the earthquake of 2008. There is also a swimming pool there called Laugasgarður which is the largest one in Iceland tied with Laugardalslaug which has too 50 m long swimming pools.

Parks
Hveragarðurinn is a park with various hot springs and fumaroles and information boards providing explanations on the occurrence. In Lystigarðurinn Fossflöt, a park which was founded in 1983, a hydroelectric power station can be visited which was built as early as 1902 beside the waterfall
Reykjafoss.

Sport
The local football club is Hamar, who play in Iceland's fourth tier.

Twin towns – sister cities

Hveragerði is twinned with:
 Äänekoski, Finland
 Ikast-Brande, Denmark
 Örnsköldsvik, Sweden
 Sigdal, Norway
 Tarp, Germany

Climate

See also
Volcanism of Iceland

References

External links

Official website 

Municipalities of Iceland
Populated places in Southern Region (Iceland)